Safadi or al-Safadi is an Arabic surname (nisba) which denotes an origin from the city of Safed (also Safad/Zefat). Safdie is a Sephardic Jewish surname of the same origin.

Notable people with the name include:
Al-Safadi, Mamluk author and historian
Al-Khalidi al-Safadi, Ottoman historian and mufti
Ayman Safadi, Jordanian politician
Bassel Safadi, Palestinian-Syrian Software engineer
Benny Safdie, American film director, one-half of the Safdie brothers
Dalal Khalil Safadi, Lebanese writer
Joe Safdie, American poet
Mohammad Safadi, Lebanese businessman and politician
Moshe Safdie, Israeli-Canadian-American architect, founder of Safdie Rabines Architects
Nicasio Safadi, Ecuadorian musician of Lebanese descent
Omar Al-Safadi, Qatari handball player
Oren Safdie, playwright and screenwriter, son of Moshe Safdie
Safdie brothers, American film directors
Shaddy Safadi, American video game artist
Sylvia Safdie, Canadian artist
Tala Safadi, Israeli-Arab Miss Earth Israel 2014
Violette Khairallah Safadi, Lebanese TV anchor

Arabic-language surnames
Safadi
Jewish surnames
People from Safed